Beinn Spionnaidh is a mountain of 773 m in Sutherland, the northwestern tip of the Scottish Highlands. It is a Corbett located west of Loch Eriboll and northeast of Cranstackie and Foinaven. It is like its neighbours in that the top, a 1 km long whaleback running southwest to northeast, is covered with loose, broken quartzite. A steep spur to the northwest, Cioch Mhor, provides one route to the top, and good views of the Kyle of Durness; the gentler slope to the southeast is tiring due to the loose rock on the upper section.

References 
 The Corbetts and Other Scottish Hill, (SMC Guide) 
 Climbing the Corbetts, Hamish Brown, 

Corbetts
Mountains and hills of the Northwest Highlands
Marilyns of Scotland